The Sussex Royal Ulster Rifles Charity Cup is the original Cup which was presented to the Sussex County FA in 1897 by the Officers and men of the Royal Irish Rifles (subsequently Royal Ulster Rifles). The 1st Battalion Royal Irish Rifles won the Sussex Senior Cup, Brighton Shield, Charity Cup and Vernon Wentworth Cup in 1895–96 and were recognised as ‘Sussex Champions’. The trophy was presented as a permanent memento of their achievement and to raise money for charity.

Since its inception in 1896–97, the Sussex (R.U.R) Charity Cup has had many different formats from an end of season invitation competition to its present knockout style. A third of all gate receipts from the matches played in the competition go to the SCFA Benevolent Fund for injured players.

Winners and finalists

1896–1914

1919–1940

1941–1945

1945–1960

1960–1975

1975–1990

1990–2005

2005–2020

2020–

Records
 Most wins: 14:
 Worthing (1904, 1907, 1908, 1910, 1914, 1921, 1927, 1934, 1940, 1942, 1945, 1949, 1953, 1954)
 Most consecutive wins: 5
 Horsham (1934, 1935, 1936, 1937, 1938)
 Most appearances in a final: 23
 Worthing
 Most consecutive appearances in a final: 8
 Horsham (1931, 1932, 1933, 1934, 1935, 1936, 1937, 1938)
 Most defeats in a final: 9
 Worthing
 Biggest win: 9 goals:
 Horsham 9–0 Worthing (1936)
 Most goals in final: 9:
 Worthing 7–2 Newhaven (1910)
 Southwick 8–1 Haywards Heath (1928)
 Eastbourne 5–4 Horsham (1933)
 Horsham 9–0 Worthing (1936)
 Haywards Heath 8–1 Seaford Town (1967)

Statistics

Performance by club

See also
 Sussex Senior Cup
 Sussex County Football Association
 Sport in Sussex

References

External links
 The RUR Cup page on the Sussex FA's official site

County Cup competitions
1896 establishments in England
Sussex